Talanitoides is a monotypic genus of Asian ground spiders.

History
Talanitoides habesor was  first described by G. Levy in 2009. It has only been found in Israel.

See also
Wildlife of Israel

References

Gnaphosidae
Monotypic Araneomorphae genera
Spiders of Asia